New Shoreham, sometimes simply called Shoreham, was a parliamentary borough centred on the town of Shoreham-by-Sea in what is now West Sussex.  It returned two Members of Parliament (MPs) to the House of Commons of England from 1295 to 1707, then to the House of Commons of Great Britain until 1800, and finally to the House of Commons of the Parliament of the United Kingdom from 1801 until it was abolished by the Redistribution of Seats Act 1885, with effect from the 1885 general election.

A modern constituency called Shoreham existed from 1974 to 1997.

Boundaries, franchise and boundary changes
New Shoreham is a part of Shoreham-by-Sea, located around its port. The borough, in 1800, had about 1,000 electors. The qualification for the vote before 1832, unusually for a borough, was the possession of a 40 shilling freehold which was the normal franchise for a county constituency.

The explanation for the franchise qualification was the result of a disputed by-election in 1770. At that time all the electors qualified by paying scot and lot, a local property tax. Stooks Smith provides two notes on what happened, following a result in which Thomas Rumbold received 87 votes and John Purling had 37 votes (a third candidate, William James, received 4 votes).

The Returning Officer on the ground that nearly all the 87 were bribed declared Mr. Purling elected, but Mr. Rumbold was seated on petition. On the 14th Feb. 1771, Mr. Roberts the Returning Officer was brought to the Bar of the House, and on his knees received a very severe reprimand from the Speaker for having taken upon himself to return Mr. Purling.

However, as a result of Mr. Roberts action there had been an investigation.

The evidence given by the Returning Officer, Mr. Hugh Roberts, before the Committee, was the means of bringing to light a most singular system of wholesale bribery, carried on by a body of Electors, who styled themselves, the "Christian Society", and who had for some time being in the habit of selling seats to the highest bidders. By 11th Geo. III. C. 55, the whole of the members, amounting to 81, were deprived of the right of again voting at any Parliamentary Election, and the old class of voters disfranchised, the right of election being extended to the 40s. freeholders of the Rape of Bramber.

The rapes were traditional subdivisions of Sussex. The six rapes each consisted of a strip of territory from the northern border of the county to its southern coast, so the area involved was considerably larger than that of the normal Parliamentary borough.

As a result of the extension of the boundaries the constituency became more like a county one than a typical borough of the era.  

When an electoral register was first compiled, before the 1832 election, the 1,925 electors included 701 freeholders and 189 scot and lot voters. The remaining electors would have qualified under the occupation franchise introduced for all boroughs by the Reform Act 1832, which also preserved the ancient right franchises of the existing electors. The twentieth century parliamentary historian Lewis Namier said that "New Shoreham was the first borough to be disenfranchised for corruption".

Members of Parliament

1295–1640

1640–1885

Election results

Elections in the 1830s

Elections in the 1840s

 
 
 

 
 

Goring's death caused a by-election.

Elections in the 1850s

Elections in the 1860s
Burrell's death caused a by-election.

 
 

Cave was appointed Vice-President of the Board of Trade, requiring a by-election.

Elections in the 1870s

 

Cave was appointed Judge Advocate General of the Armed Forces and Paymaster General, requiring a by-election.

Burrell's death caused a by-election.

Elections in the 1880s

See also
 Unreformed House of Commons

Notes and references

  Victoria History of the County of Sussex – south part of the Rape of Bramber
 Boundaries of Parliamentary Constituencies 1885–1972, compiled and edited by F. W. S. Craig (Parliamentary Reference Publications 1972)
 British Parliamentary Election Results 1832–1885, compiled and edited by F.W.S. Craig (The Macmillan Press 1977)
 The Parliaments of England by Henry Stooks Smith (1st edition published in three volumes 1844–50), second edition edited (in one volume) by F.W.S. Craig (Political Reference Publications 1973) out of copyright
 Who's Who of British Members of Parliament: Volume I 1832–1885, edited by M. Stenton (The Harvester Press 1976)
D. Brunton & D. H. Pennington, Members of the Long Parliament (London: George Allen & Unwin, 1954)
Cobbett's Parliamentary history of England, from the Norman Conquest in 1066 to the year 1803 (London: Thomas Hansard, 1808) 
 Maija Jansson (ed.), Proceedings in Parliament, 1614 (House of Commons) (Philadelphia: American Philosophical Society, 1988) 
 J E Neale, The Elizabethan House of Commons (London: Jonathan Cape, 1949)
 

Adur District
Parliamentary constituencies in South East England (historic)
Politics of West Sussex
Constituencies of the Parliament of the United Kingdom established in 1295
Constituencies of the Parliament of the United Kingdom disestablished in 1885